During World War II, Operation Candytuft was a British raid by 2nd Special Air Service launched on 27 October 1943.

Description
Inserted by boat on Italy’s east coast between Ancona and Pescara, the troopers were to destroy railway bridges and disrupt rear areas. The raid was conducted by No. 3 Commando and 6 Demolition Corps under the command of Major Terence Otway. They were dropped as planned at Naine, a small village 10 miles north of the objectives. A fire fight broke out in the village due to the unexpected presence of the 153 grenadiers who were transferred from the Gustav line three days earlier. In order to replenish his supplies Major Ottoway retreated south to Malconi where he and his team were surrounded by the Wehrmacht and later surrendered.

See also
 Operation Saxifrage, run at the same time as Operation Candytuft

Conflicts in 1943
World War II British Commando raids
Special Air Service
1943 in Italy
Battles and conflicts without fatalities
20th century in Abruzzo
History of Ancona